Oscar "Oss" Jackson was an American baseball outfielder and first baseman in the late 19th century, who played for predecessor teams to the Negro leagues. He played for several teams from 1887 to 1906, spending the majority of his career with the Cuban Giants. He was the brother of fellow player Andrew Jackson.

References

External links

Year of birth missing
Year of death missing
Cuban Giants players
Baseball outfielders